Kalasatama metro station (- "Fish Harbor") is a ground-level station on the Helsinki Metro, in the capital city of Finland. The station was opened on 1 January 2007, and it serves the eastern part of the central Helsinki district of Sörnäinen's quarter Kalasatama. The area is mainly composed of offices and apartments, with new residential and commercial developments being under construction in the area, including the shopping center Redi. The port facilities previously in the area were moved to Vuosaari Harbour in 2008.

Unlike most other stations on the Helsinki Metro, Kalasatama was built while the metro was still running, which made construction difficult. Despite this, service was not greatly affected on either of the lines during the station's construction. Because the new platforms were built on either side of the existing metro track, Kalasatama is one of only two stations on the Helsinki Metro to have two separate side platforms. The other example of this layout on the Helsinki Metro is Itäkeskus metro station. Other metro stations have only singular island platforms.

Kalasatama metro station is located 1.1 kilometres from Sörnäinen metro station, and 1.8 kilometres from Kulosaari metro station.

References

External links
 

Helsinki Metro stations
Railway stations opened in 2007
2007 establishments in Finland